Five Mile or 5 Mile can refer to:
Five Mile River, in Connecticut
Five Mile River (East Brookfield River), in central Massachusetts
Five Mile River, Nova Scotia, Canada
Five Mile Pond (Plymouth, Massachusetts)
Five mile road, in Michigan
The Five Mile Lane, another name for A4226 road in Vale of Glamorgan, Wales
Five Mile Airport, in Alaska
"5 Mile (These Are the Days)", a song by Turin Brakes

See also
Five Mile Bridge (disambiguation)
Five Mile Creek (disambiguation)
Five Mile River (disambiguation)
8 Mile (disambiguation)